Studied in 1959, the Saturn B-1, was a four-stage concept rocket similar to the Jupiter-C, and consisted of a Saturn IB first stage, a cluster of four Titan I first stages used for a second stage, a S-IV third stage and a Centaur high-energy liquid-fueled fourth stage. Like its proposed predecessors, the Saturn B-1 never flew and neither did the Titan cluster stage. The S-IV however flew on the Saturn I.

See also
List of space launch system designs

References 
 Koelle, Heinz Hermann, Handbook of Astronautical Engineering, McGraw-Hill,New York, 1961. The only such comprehensive handbook ever produced, and at the dawn of the space age.
 Bilstein, Roger E, Stages to Saturn, US Government Printing Office, 1980. . Excellent account of the evolution, design, and development of the Saturn launch vehicles.

Saturn (rocket family)
Cancelled space launch vehicles